The Noida Sector 81 is the metro station of the Noida Metro railway, in the city of Noida in India. It was opened on 25 January 2019.

References

External links

Noida Metro stations
Railway stations in Gautam Buddh Nagar district
Transport in Noida